Sitte (Siitte) is a rural locality (a selo), the only inhabited locality, and the administrative center of Sittinsky Rural Okrug of Kobyaysky District in the Sakha Republic, Russia. Its population as of the 2010 Census was 503, of whom 243 were male and 260 female, up from 466 recorded during the 2002 Census.

Geography 
Sitte is a village of the central part of Yakutia, in the Central Yakutian Lowland, west of the Lena River and east of the Sitte River.

References

Notes

Sources
Official website of the Sakha Republic. Registry of the Administrative-Territorial Divisions of the Sakha Republic. Kobyaysky District. 

Rural localities in Kobyaysky District
Central Yakutian Lowland